Terrormolinos is a text adventure released by Melbourne House in 1985 for the ZX Spectrum, Commodore 64, Amstrad CPC, BBC Micro and Acorn Electron, all retailing for £7.95.

Summary
The game revolves around surviving a package holiday to the Spanish resort of Terrormolinos (a play on Torremolinos) and bringing back home ten snapshots. The user takes the role of the husband and goes away on a package holiday with wife Beryl and two children, Ken and Doreen. To successfully complete the game, a player must take ten photographs to illustrate the "happy" holiday.

Terrormolinos was a follow-up to Melbourne House's successful Hampstead, produced by the same team with almost identical interface, and using the same style of satirical humour. The magazine adverts for the game said, "Just When You Thought It Was Safe To Have A Holiday ...", referencing the famous tagline from Jaws 2.

It was reviewed in Crash issue 23 and rated 9/10, a 'Crash Smash'.

The game was written with a modified version of The Quill.

References

External links
 
 

1980s interactive fiction
1985 video games
Adventure games
Amstrad CPC games
BBC Micro and Acorn Electron games
Commodore 64 games
Video games developed in the United Kingdom
Video games set in Europe
ZX Spectrum games